Henry Houghton Trivick (1908 — 1982) was a British painter, lithographer and author of art books.

Biography 

Henry Trivick was the great grandson of the Anglo-American artist Benjamin West. He studied at the Central School of Arts and Crafts in London, later teaching lithography there.

Trivick was a friend of the painter Stanley Spencer for over twenty years - both had lived in Cookham, Berkshire. He was a visiting instructor at the Regent Street Polytechnic (now the University of Westminster) where he taught Spencer the art of lithography. Spencer made only three lithographs, all under the guidance of Henry Trivick. Trivick also collaborated with Spencer to produce lithographs from Spencer's drawings.

Publications 

Trivick published the following art books:

 Trivick, H. (1969). Autolithography, Faber and Faber, London. 
 Trivick, H. (1969). The Craft and Design of Monumental Brasses, J. Baker, Humanities P., London, New York 
 Trivick, H. (1971). The Picture Book of Brasses in Gilt, John Baker, London.

Notes and references

Further reading 

 Pople, K. (1991) Stanley Spencer: A Biography, Collins, London.

External links 
 Images of Trivick's paintings on Artfact

1908 births
1982 deaths
British lithographers
British printmakers
20th-century lithographers